Render, rendered, or rendering may refer to:

Computing
 Rendering (computer graphics), generating an image from a model by means of computer programs
 Architectural rendering, creating two-dimensional images or animations showing the attributes of a proposed architectural design
 Artistic rendering, creating, shading, and texturing of an image
 Typesetting, composition of text for visual display
 Rendering engine, the software that transforms (renders) data into a picture
 3D rendering, generating image or motion picture from virtual 3D models
 Browser engine, component of a web browser that renders web pages
 High-dynamic-range rendering, allows preservation of details that may be lost due to limiting contrast ratios
 Non-photorealistic rendering, focuses on enabling a wide variety of expressive styles for digital art
 Scanline rendering, algorithm for visible surface determination
 Volume rendering, used to display a 2D projection of a 3D discretely sampled data set
 Ray tracing (graphics) and Physically based rendering, uses lighting equations based on physics for more realistic images.

Arts, entertainment, and media
 Rendered (radio program), an independent radio program about the DIY (do-it-yourself) movement
 Rendered in Vain, a 2006 album by Zonaria
 Rendered Waters, a 2011 album by Kingdom Come
 "Render" a song by Northlane from the album Mesmer, 2017
 Rendering (Berio), a composition by Luciano Berio based on sketches for Franz Schubert's tenth symphony

People
 Adam Render (1822–1881), German-American hunter, prospector and trader in southern Africa
 Arlene Render (born 1943), American diplomat
 George Render (1887–1922), English cricketer
 Mattiline Render (born 1947), American sprinter
 Michael Render  (born 1975), better known as Killer Mike, American rapper
 Rudy Render (1926–2014), American musician and songwriter
 Sergio Render (born 1986), American football player
 Shirley Render (born 1943), Canadian politician
 Sylvia Lyons Render (1913–1986), American academic and curator
 Tyshun Render (born 1997), American football player
 William Render ( 1800), German grammarian and translator

Other uses
 Rendering (animal products), separation of animal fat from other tissues, to convert waste animal tissue into value-added materials
 Cement render or stucco, a surface covering to the external façade of buildings
 Salute render, raising an unfolded right hand to the forehead to show respect or subjection to senior officers

See also
 Rendition (disambiguation)